The 2012–13 Segunda Divisão season was the 79th season since its establishment. Varzim were the defending champions. It was the last edition of the competition as Campeonato Nacional de Seniores was created in 2013 to replace the Segunda Divisão B and Terceira Divisão (third and fourth tier of the Portuguese football league system respectively) for the 2013–14 season.

Zona Norte

Zona Centro

Zona Sul

Play-offs

Top goalscorers

References

Portuguese Second Division seasons
Port
3